Philautus dubius is a species of frog in the family Rhacophoridae.
It is endemic to India.

References

Endemic fauna of India
Frogs of India
dubius
Amphibians described in 1882
Taxonomy articles created by Polbot